Itihasa refers to the collection of written descriptions of important events in Hinduism. It includes the Mahabharata, the Puranas and the Ramayana. The Mahabharata includes the story of the Kurukshetra War and preserves the traditions of the Lunar dynasty in the form of embedded tales. The Puranas narrate universal history – the books discuss in depth the topics of cosmogony, myth, legend and history. The Ramayana contains the story of Rama and is incidentally related to the legends of the Solar dynasty. A story is considered to be itihasa only when the author of the story has himself witnessed or is part of the story. Vyasa, who wrote the Mahabharata, is himself a character in the story. Similarly, Valmiki, who wrote the Ramayana, was also a character in the story. Many classical Indian poets derive the plots of their poetry and drama from the Itihasa. The tradition of itihāsa is generally understood to be developed by the bardic tradition of Sūtas and Cāraṇas whose duties consisted of composing royal eulogies.

Etymology
The Sanskrit term itihāsa  was derived from the phrase iti ha āsa , which means "so indeed it was". It, in turn, was derived from the word asti , which means "he is".

Hindu Tradition

Cosmogony

According to the Hindu texts, time is cyclic. The history of mankind is divided into four ages—Satya Yuga, Treta Yuga, Dvapara Yuga and Kali Yuga—collectively forming one Maha Yuga. Seventy-one Maha Yugas form a Manvantara ("age of Manu"), a period of time over which a "Manu" presides. For the duration of his period, each Manu is the archetypal first man, the progenitor of humanity, and also the first king and lawgiver. Along with a Manu, every Manvantara also has its own set of Indra, gods and the seven sages. Fourteen Manus reign in Kalpa, (a single day in the life of) Brahma), an equivalent of 1,000 Maha Yugas, at the end of which, the creation is destroyed and is followed by a Pralaya (dissolution) of equal length. The creation starts again, in the next Kalpa in an endless cycle of creations and dissolutions.

The traditions relate that the present Kalpa is called Varaha. Out of the fourteen manvantaras in this Kalpa, six have passed. The current Manvantara is called Vaivasvata after the Manu who presides over it. It is to Vaivasvata Manu that the royal genealogies of the Itihasa trace their origin. It was in the Chakshusha manvantara, which immediately preceded the present manvantara, that king Prithu, the great grandson of Chakshusha Manu, leveled the earth, built cities and villages and developed agriculture, trade, pasture and cattle-breeding. This cycle ended after only eight more generations with the Great Flood.

The Satya Yuga

The Great Flood at the end of Chakshusa manvantara wipes away all life forms. Only Vaivasvata Manu is saved by Lord Vishnu, in the avatar of a fish, Matsya to repopulate the earth in the next cycle.  All royal lines in the present cycle are traced in the itihasas from Manu Vaivasvata's sons and his only daughter Ila. Ikshvaku, the eldest son of Manu, establishes the Solar Line (from Vivasvan, the sun-god, the father of Vaivasvata Manu) at Ayodhya in Kosala. Iksvaku's younger son Nimi migrates a little further east and founds the house of Videha. Its capital Mithila is established by his son Mithi,  also called Janaka which later becomes the generic name for the kings of Videha.

The lunar line is established at about the same time, at Pratisthana (identified with a suburb of modern day Allahabad) in Madhyadesha (the doab between Ganga and Yamuna rivers) by Pururavas, the son of Ila and Budha, the illegitimate child of Soma, the moon-god. The tale of his love for the nymph Urvasi is a tale that has caught the Indian imagination for generations. It is the subject of a famous classical work by Kalidasa called Vikramorvasiyam. While Ayus, the elder son of Pururavas ascends the throne after him, his younger brother, Amavasu founds another dynasty that reigned over a kingdom, centred around Kanyakubja (modern Kannauj).

The lunar line again splits into two after the reign of Ayus, the eldest son of Pururavas. Nahusa, the eldest son of Ayus, succeeds him, but obtains the position of Indra in the heaven but is banished from there when he lusts after Sachi, the wife of Indra. Ksatravrddha, another son of Ayus, establishes the dynasty of Kashi (Varanasi). His descendants were called Kaseyas.

Nahusa's son and successor Yayati was a renowned conqueror and was reckoned as a cakravartin. He had two sons named Yadu and Turvasu from Devayani, the daughter of Sukra, the preceptor of asuras. He also had three other sons, Druhyu, Anu and Puru from Sarmistha, the daughter of asura king Vrsaparva. Yayati installs Puru, the youngest. but the most dutiful son as his successor in the ancestral sovereignty in Pratisthana. The elder sons obtain the outlying areas. From the sons of Yayati, descend the five famous royal lines of the Yadavas, the Turvasus, the Druhyus, the Anavas and the Pauravas, together called the Pancha Jana or the Five Tribes.

Immediately after Yadu, the Yadava dynasty is bifurcated – the main line continued by Krosti and the independent line of Haihayas led by Sahasrajit.  The Yadava branch first develops a great principality under king Sasabindu, who becomes a cakravrtin. King Mandhata, the son of Yuvansva, the king of Ayodhya marries his daughter Bindumati and rises to eminence. He follows in the footsteps of his father-in-law, extends his sway very widely and becomes a cakravrtin himself. His son Purukutsa marries Narmada, the river goddess. Another son, also a famous king, called Mucukunda builds and fortifies a town on the bank of that river; it was Mahismati.

Soon thereafter, the Druhyu king Gandhara retires to the northwest (modern Khyber-Pakhtunkhwa) and establishes the kingdom of Gandhara there. His descendants scatter into the regions beyond India and establish many mleccha principalities. Later, the Anavas divide into two branches under Usinara and Titiksu. The sons of Usinara establish separate tribes of the Yaudheyas, Ambasthas, Navarastras, Krimilas and Sivis in eastern Punjab. Sivi, the son of Usinara and the originator of the Sivis in Sivapura, is celebrated in the Indian mythology for his generosity. His sons set up the kingdoms of Vrsadarbhas, Madrakas, Kaikayas and Sauviras, and occupy the whole Punjab. The other branch of the Anavas under Titiksu moved east and founded the principalities of Anga, Banga, Kalinga, Suhma and Pundra.

The Haihaya king Krtavirya had the Bhargavas as his priests and enriched them. His kinsmen tried to recover the wealth but the Bhargavas resisted. The Haihayas then maltreated them due to which they fled to different countries. Gadhi was then king of Kanyakubja and had a daughter Satyavati. The Bhargava rsi Rcika marries her and begets a son Jamadagni. About the same time Gadhi has a son Visvamitra.

In the solar line, Trayyaruna, a near contemporary of Gadhi and Krtavirya, ruled the kingdom of Ayodhya at this time. On the counsel of his priest Vasistha, he exiles his son Satyavrata, also called Trisanku. After Trayyaruna, Vasistha refuses to perform Trisanku's consecration.  A little later, Visvamitra of Kanyakubja tries to obtain the wishing cow Nandini of Vasistha. A fierce combat follows between the two, in which Visvamitra is defeated. Convinced of the superiority of brahmins, he resolves to become a brahmarsi and relinquishes his throne.  When engaged in austerities, Visvamitra is befriended by Trisanku. He then champions Trisanku's cause, performs his royal consecration and on his death elevates him in his living body to heaven.

The rivalry of Visvamitra and Vasistha continues even during the reign of Hariscandra, Trisanku's son. Hariscandra had a son Rohita, whom he had vowed to sacrifice to Varuna. He postponed the sacrifice for many years due to which he is afflicted with dropsy. Rohita, on Vasistha's advice, to propitiate Varuna, buys Ajigarta's son Sunahsepa (who is Visvamitra's grandnephew) as sacrificial victim in his stead. When about to be killed, Sunahsepa chants the varunamantra, taught to him by Visvamitra. Varuna appears, grants the boy his freedom and the king a cure from the disease. Visvamitra then adopts the boy as his chief son with the name Devarata. A number of Visvamitra's sons, who protest against the status given to Devarata, are cursed by their angry father to become outcastes. They become the ancestors of Dasyu tribes, such as the Andhras, Mutibas, Pulindas, etc. Visvamitra, subsequently, obtains the position of a brahmarsi.

In the Haihaya line, Krtavirya was succeeded by his son Arjuna Kartavirya, who was a mighty king. After a long reign he has dissension with Jamadagni. As a result, Parasurama, the son of Jamadagni by Renuka, the daughter of a minor Iksvaku king, kills Kartavirya Arjuna, whereupon Kartavirya's son's kill Jamadagni. In revenge, Parasurama resolves to slaughter the entire class of warriors (kshatriyas), and so far succeeds that only five survive to continue the great dynasties.

After Kartavirya, the Haihayas divided into five collateral tribes – the Talajanghas, the Vitihotras, the Avantyas, Tudikeras and Jatas. They attack Ayodhya and drive king Bahu from the throne. They also attack, defeat and drive the Kasi king Divodasa from Varanasi. Pratardana, the son of Divodasa subdues the Vitihotras and recovers the throne. A little later, Bahu begets a son Sagara, and Sagara defeats all those enemies, regains his kingdom and destroys the Haihaya power for good.

Sagara had sixty thousand sons who insult Kapila rsi and are, in turn, reduced to ashes by him. Therefore, Sagara is succeeded by his grandson Amsuman on the throne of Ayodhya. With the reign of Sagara, the Satya Yuga comes to an end.

The Treta Yuga

Bhagiratha, the great grandson of Sagara brings down the divine river Ganges to earth to expiate the sins of the sons of Sagara. Rtuparna is the next prominent king in the dynasty made famous by his association with Nala, the king of Nisadas. Nala married Damayanti, the daughter of Bhima, the Yadava king of Vidarbha. The delightful story of their marriage and the unhappy sequel of his subsequent temporary loss of his kingdom and destitution through gambling, is in the Mahabharata told to Yudhishthira suffering in similar circumstances.

After a long eclipse (corresponding to the ascendency of the solar dynasty under Mandhata), the Paurava line is revived by Dusyanta, a near contemporary of Bhagiratha. He marries Sakuntala, the daughter of Visvamitra and begets Bharata. Bharata is crowned as a cakravartin and later gives his name to the dynasty, to the great fratricidal war between the Kauravas and Pandavas, and to India itself (i.e. Bharatavarsa). His fifth successor Hastin shifts the capital to a place in the upper doab and calls it Hastinapura, after himself.

Soon after Hastin, the Bharata dynasty is divided into four separate lines – the most well-known being the main Paurava line and the Pancala line. The Pancala king Divodasa is celebrated as the destroyer of 99 forts of the dasyu Sambara. His sister was Ahalya, the wife of Gautama. She was deceived by Indra and expelled into the forest by her husband on account of her infidelity.

The solar line once again ascends under the benevolent kingship of Raghu, Aja and Dasharatha. The story of Rama, Dasharatha's son, forms the subject of the poem Ramayana by Valmiki. The intrigues of his stepmother Kaikeyi result in the exile of Rama, his wife Sita and his brother Laksmana to the forest. In the forest, Sita is abducted by Ravana, the king of raksasas and imprisoned in Lanka, his capital. Rama forms an alliance with the monkeys and the bears of the forest and lays a siege of Lanka. Ravana is ultimately defeated and slain by Rama. He then returns to Ayodhya with his wife Sita and ascends the throne.
 
With Rama's disappearance, the Treta Yuga comes to a close and the Dvapara Yuga commences. After Rama the solar dynasty goes into permanent decline.

The Dvapara Yuga

The Yadava line is once again split into two separate lines after the reign of Bhima, the son of Satvat by his sons Andhaka and Vrsni, who style their dynasties after their respective names. Ugrasena, the father of Kamsa was an Andhaka while Vasudeva Anakadundubhi, the father of Krishna was a Vrsni.

The Pancala Bharata dynasty under its king Srnjaya now rises to prominence. His son Cyavana-Pijavana was a great warrior and the latter's son, Sudas, annexed several kingdoms. A confederacy of the kings of the Pauravas, the Yadavas, the Sivis, the Druhyus, the Matsyas, the Turvasus and others, is formed against Sudas, who defeats them in a great battle near the river Parusni. This is called the Battle of the Ten Kings.  The bulk of hymns (Book II-IX) represents only 5 to 6 generations of kings (and of contemporary poets) of this dynasty.

The Paurava line continues through Ajamidha, the son of Hasti. In his line, king Samvarana was defeated and exiled to the forests on the bank of river Sindhu by the Pancalas. Pargiter identifies this Pancala king as Sudas but the exact relationship between the dynasties, chronological and political, is not recorded. Later, Samvarana reobtains his capital from the Pancalas and marries Tapati, a daughter of the Sun. The playwright Kulasekhara (c. 900AD) has immortalized their story in his play Tapatisamvarana. Their son was Kuru and his descendants were called Kauravas. The line continues through Kuru's second son Jahnu.

Vasu, a descendant of Kuru conquers the Yadava kingdom of Cedi, and establishes himself there. His eldest son, Brhadratha founds Girivraja in Magadha as his capital. His son Jarasandha extends his power up to Mathura (ruled by Andhaka king, Kamsa, who acknowledged him as overlord) in the north and Vidarbha in the south. Kamsa was a tyrant. He had imprisoned his father and usurped the throne. His nephew Krishna kills him and restores the old king to his throne. This rouses Jarasandha's wrath and he attacks Mathura. Krishna along with the Andhakas and Vrsnis migrate to the West coast and build a new capital Dvaravati (Dvaraka) in Saurastra. Krishna then abducts Rukmini, the princess of Vidarbha, defeating her brother and marries her.  In later life, Krishna becomes the friend of the Pandavas.

The next famous king in the Kaurava line is Pratipa. His son, Santanu supersedes his elder brother Devapi to the throne, whereupon no rain falls for twelve years. Devapi then acts as a Hotr (chief priest) and performs sacrifice for his brother and obtains rain.

Santanu's grandsons were Dhrtarastra and Pandu. The former being blind, the latter ascends the throne. Dhrtarastra has many sons of whom Duryodhana is the eldest; and Pandu has five sons, Yudhishthira, Bhima, Arjuna, Nakula and Sahadeva. The sons of Dhrtarastra belonging to the elder branch were called Kauravas and Pandu's sons, the Pandavas. The question of succession to the throne results in a feud between the two families culminating in the appalling slaughter in the Bharata War. All the old kshatriya dynasties of India, it is said, took part in the great battle, fighting on one side or the other. In the battle, which lasts for eighteen days, the ruses of Krishna enable the hard pressed Pandavas to win. The Mahabharata narrates the story of this feud in detail.

Subsequently, the Yadavas are themselves engulfed in civil war, and Krishna withdraws to the life of an ascetic in the forest. Here he is accidentally shot and killed by a hunter. His grandson is re-established at Indraprastha by the Pandavas. Soon the Pandavas themselves crown Pariksita, the grandson of Arjuna on the throne of Hastinapura and retire to the forest. The Dvapara Yuga closes with the departure of Krishna.

The Kali Yuga

Pariksita, on a hunting expedition, disrespects rsi Samika and is in turn, cursed by his son Srngin to die from snake Taksaka’s poison within seven days. Taksaka buys off Kasyapa, the only person who has an antidote to the poison. At the end of seven days, Pariksit dies from Taksaka's bite. His son Janamejaya, who was a minor then, later hears his father's death from his ministers, and resolves on revenge. He organizes a rite (sarpasatra) to destroy all snakes. The snakes enter the sacrificial fire by the power of the rite.  Astika, (a half snake from his mother's side) who was begotten to save them, enters the rite and wins a boon of his choice by singing the praises of Janamejaya. He demands the proceedings be halted. Janamejaya cannot refuse and concludes the rite.  It is during this rite that Vaisampayana, a disciple of Vyasa narrates the Mahabharata to Janamejaya.

Nicaksu, sixth in line from Pariksita, transfers his capital from Hastinapura to Kausambi in Vasta as the former city is ravaged by a flood of the Ganges. The line continues for many generations till Udayana, the famous king of Vatsa (and a contemporary of Buddha) who carries off Vasavadatta, the princess of Avanti. Their tale is celebrated first by Gunadhya in his novel Brhatkatha and later by Bhasa and Shudraka in their dramas Svapnavasavadatta and Vinavasavadatta, respectively.

In Magadha, the descendants of Brhadratha and Jarasandha retain the throne till they are replaced by the Sisunaga dynasty, which among others include the famous kings Bimbisara and Ajatashatru. Mahapadma Nanda usurps the throne from the last king of the Sisunaga line. He overthrows all old kshatriya dynasties - the Iksvakus, the Pancalas, the Kaseyas, the Haihayas, the Kalingas, the Asmakas, the Kurus, the Maithilas, the Surasenas and the Vitihotras – and subdues the whole central India. The Puranas, hence, call him the 'destroyer of all kshatriyas' and 'monarch of the whole earth which was under his sole sway'.

According to the Mahabharata, the Kali Yuga will close with the coming of Kalki, at which point the Satya Yuga will recommence.

Conclusion
This lengthy history of kings and sages is rounded off by the bards with a hint of cynicism regarding the ephemeral nature of fame:

Jaina tradition

The Jainas have their own version of traditional history, brought into line with their legends of the 24 Jinas who from time to time have refounded their religion on earth. Rama, whom the Jainas call Padma, appears as a divine hero and a Baladeva, in a variant version of his life, whilst Krsna is similarly a Vasudeva (and his brother Balarama, a Baladeva). There are nine each of these Baladeva and Vasudeva heroes, and their nine enemies (Prativasudevas), including Ravana and Jarasandha. With the Jinas and the twelve universal emperors cakravartins this makes up the sixty-three ‘great men’ of their tradition. The emperors include Bharata and Sagara, and Brahmadeva or Brahmadatta who is familiar also to the Buddhists, but the others are not familiar elsewhere. Three of them, including Santi, became Jinas also. The Jaina traditions seem to draw in part on ancient sources independent of those of the brahmanas, as do the Buddhists also, and are not merely corruptions of Brahmanical traditions. It is noticeable that their legends are much more schematic and regular than the others.

Buddhist tradition

The Buddhists preserve another different version of the traditional history. According to them, in the beginning of the cosmic cycle mankind lived on an immaterial plane where there was no need of food and clothing and no private property, family, government or laws. Then gradually the process of cosmic decay sets in and mankind becomes earthbound and feel the need of food and shelter. As men lose their primeval glory distinctions of class (varna) arise and they enter into agreements with one another, accepting the institutions of private property and the family. With this theft, murder, adultery and other crime begin. So, the people meet together and decide to appoint one man among them to maintain order in return for a share of the produce of their fields and herds. This, then, was the first king called Mahasammata (‘the great chosen one’). He receives the title of raja because he pleased the people. The first cakravartin, Mandhata is sixth in descent from Mahasammata. Mandhata is followed by a long succession of kings – the most famous among them include Sudarsana, Sagara, Bharata and Rama Dasarathi (the last three known to the Brahmanical and Jain Traditions).

In this line was born a king called Karnika who had two sons Gautama and Bharadvaja. Bharadvaja ascends the throne after his father's death, but dies without any issue. On the other hand, two children are born from eggs, which were formed from coagulated blood and semen of Gautama and hatched by the sun. From one of the eggs comes the famous Iksvaku (Pali ‘Okkaka’), who succeeds Bharadvaja and founds the solar dynasty.
 
The four sons and four daughters of Iksvaku are exiled to the foothills of the Himalayas due to the machinations of their stepmother. They intermarry amongst themselves to maintain the purity of their blood and later establish the towns of Kapilavastu and Koli. Their descendants were called Sakyas. The famous Prince Visvantara (Pali 'Vessantara') was a near descendant of Okkaka. Later, the Buddha is born in this dynasty.

Itihasa as a source of actual history

Historian Romila Thapar discusses the problem of associating "major lineages of the early tradition" with archaeological evidence (e.g. with Painted Grey Ware or Chalcolithic Black and Red Ware), understanding the Puranic genealogies as "records of a general pattern of settlements and migrations", rather than "factual information on history and chronology". She tries, however, to associate the chronology of the "obviously more significant lineages, that of the Puru and the Yadavas" with different archaeological layers. Like Pargiter, she divides the Puru lineage into three distinct phases, connecting phase I (from Manu to Bharata) with the Ochre Coloured Pottery, phase II (after a break, from Bharata's "adopted sons" to Kuru) with the Painted Grey Ware; phase III (starting from Kuru) being terminated by the Mahabharata war. The Yadava line is associated with the Black and Red ware, the geographical distribution of which is traced in connection with the different branches and migrations of the Yadava tribe, according to the Puranic sources. She concludes, however more cautiously ("The attempt to link the Puru and Yadava lineages with certain archaeological cultures ... has resulted in some echoes of identification, but nothing more definite than that can be said at this point. The identification remains speculative ..."), by considering the problem of chronology (archaeological evidence versus "traditional" chronology) and the question of identifying the Indo-Aryan speakers, phase I (up to Bharata) being understood as a pre-Indo-Aryan lineage, which was taken over later into the tradition of the Aryan-speaking people.

Influence on classical Indian poetry
The rules of classical Indian poetics prescribe that the themes of the mahakavyas (ornate epics) and natakas (drama) should primarily be selected from the itihasa. In accordance, great mahakavyas such as Kalidasa’s Raghuvamsa, Kumaradasa’s Janaki-harana, Bhatti's Ravanavadha (or Bhattikavya)  have drawn their themes from the Ramayana, and Bharavi’s Kiratarjuniya, Magha’s Sisupalavadha and Sriharsa's Naisadhiyacarita from the Mahabharata.

See also
 Hindu mythology
 Buddhist mythology
 Jain cosmology
 History of India
 Hindu epics
 Ramayana
 Mahabharata
 Puranas
Historicity of the Mahabharata

References

Notes

Primary Sources (Sanskrit, Pali, Prakrit and Tamil)

Vyasa, Mahabharata. See translation at www.sacred-texts.com
 Harivamsa
Valmiki, Ramayana. See translation at www.sacred-texts.com
Rigveda
Atharvaveda
Satapatha Brahmana
Puranas
Vishnu Purana
Vayu Purana
Matsya Purana
Devi Bhagavata Purana
Manu Smriti
Tripitaka
Mahavastu
Lalitavistara
Bhagavati Sutra
Hemacandra, Trisastisalakapurusacaritra
Kalidasa
Abhijnanasakuntalam
Raghuvamsa
Vikramorvasiyam
Bhasa
Svapnavasavadatta
Pratijnayaugandharayana
Balacarita
Karnabhara
Dutavakya
Urubhanga
Madhyamavyayoga
Pancaratra
Dutaghatotkacha
Pratimanataka
Abhishekanataka
Sarvasena, Harivijaya
Panini, Jambavativijaya
Ksemendra, Sasivamsa
Mentha, Hayagiva vadha
Bhavabhuti
Mahaviracarita
Uttararamacarita
Bhattanarayana, Venisamhara
Jayadeva, Gitagovinda
Venkatanatha Vedanta Desika, Yadavabhyudaya
Murari, Anargha Raghava
Pratapa Rudra Deva, Yayati Caritra
Rajasekhara, Pracanda Pandava
Damodar Misra, Hanumananataka
Asvaghosa
Buddhacarita
Saudarananda
Vimala Suri, Pauma cariya
Pravarasena, Setubandha
Silacharya, Caupanna mahapurisa cariya
Jinasena, Harivamsa purana

Further reading

Pargiter, F.E.
Ancient Indian Historical Tradition. Delhi. 1972.
The Purana Text of the Dynasties of the Kali Age. Oxford. 1913.
Winternitz, M. History of Indian Literature. Vol. I-II. Delhi. 1987.
Rapson, E.J. The Cambridge History of India. Vol. I Cambridge. 1922.
Warder, A.K. Indian Kavya Literature, Vol. I-VII. Delhi. 2004.
Smith, R. Morton Dates and dynasties in earliest India: translation and justification of a critical text of the Purana dynasties, Shastri, J. L. (ed.). Delhi. Motilal Banarasidass. 1973.
Smith, Mary Carroll The core of India's great Epic. Harvard University. 1972.
Thapar, Romila
"Puranic Lineages and archaeological cultures" in Ancient Indian Social History: some interpretations. New Delhi. Orient Longmans. 1978.
"Origin Myths and the early Indian historical tradition" in Ancient Indian Social History: some interpretations. New Delhi. Orient Longmans. 1978.
"Genealogy as a source of social history" in Ancient Indian Social History: some interpretations. New Delhi. Orient Longmans. 1978.

Indian poetics
History of literature in India
Sanskrit literature
Epic poetry
E